Saint Elizabeth's Parish Church is a Roman Catholic parish church in Paso de los Toros, Uruguay.

The parish was established in 1903. The church, dedicated to Saint Elizabeth of Portugal, is in Gothic Revival style.

References

External links
 History of the Parish Church of Saint Elizabeth 

Paso de los Toros
1903 establishments in Uruguay

Roman Catholic church buildings in Tacuarembó Department
Gothic Revival church buildings in Uruguay
20th-century Roman Catholic church buildings in Uruguay